Dhara may refer to:

 Dhara (deity), an earth god in Hinduism
 Dhara (city), capital of the Paramara rulers of central India, now called Dhar